ZDC may refer to:

 Washington Air Route Traffic Control Center, an Area Control Center in Leesburg, Virginia, United States
 ZDC, the Pinyin code for Zhengding Airport railway station, Shijiazhuang, Hebei Province, China